Bradley Woodward (born 5 July 1998) is an Australian swimmer. He competed at the 2018 Commonwealth Games, winning silver in the 100 metre and the 200 metre backstroke events. Woodward also competed in lifesaving at the 2017 World Games, winning three medals.

References

External links
 
 

1998 births
Living people
Sportsmen from New South Wales
Swimmers at the 2018 Commonwealth Games
Swimmers at the 2022 Commonwealth Games
Commonwealth Games medallists in swimming
Commonwealth Games gold medallists for Australia
Commonwealth Games silver medallists for Australia
Commonwealth Games bronze medallists for Australia
World Games gold medalists
World Games silver medalists
World Games bronze medalists
Competitors at the 2017 World Games
Australian male backstroke swimmers
21st-century Australian people
Medallists at the 2018 Commonwealth Games
Medallists at the 2022 Commonwealth Games